Move It On Over may refer to:
"Move It On Over" (song), a 1947 song by Hank Williams
Move It On Over (album), a 1978 album by George Thorogood & The Destroyers, named after the above song